The Steinwache is a memorial museum in Dortmund, Germany. 

The police station Steinwache was established in 1906. Since 1928 a prison next to the station was in use for detention of suspects. In 1933 the Gestapo took over the prison and imprisoned and tortured many opponents of the Nazi regime. It soon had a reputation as Die Hölle von Westdeutschland ("The hell of western Germany"). Between 1933 and 1945 more than 66,000 people were imprisoned in the Steinwache prison. In the early years of the regime the inmates were primarily members of the communist and social democratic opposition. During World War II foreign forced labourers made up the largest group of prisoners. Especially slave workers from eastern Europe were often badly treated and many of them were executed.

In contrast to most of Dortmund's city center, the Steinwache wasn't heavily damaged during the war. The conversion of the former prison into a memorial site began in the 1980s. Since 1992 it is the permanent location of the exhibition Widerstand und Verfolgung in Dortmund 1933–1945 ("Resistance and Persecution in Dortmund 1933-1945"), which demonstrates the persecution under National Socialism with many photographs, short texts and sometimes with reports from contemporary witnesses.

External links
 Website of the memorial, City of Dortmund

Monuments and memorials to the victims of Nazism
Dortmund
Gestapo